Laura Johns (born 31 August 1994) is an Australian professional soccer player. She currently plays for Adelaide United in the W-League.

Club career

Adelaide United

2012–13
Johns joined Adelaide United in 2012 and made her Adelaide United debut in a 4–3 win over the Western Sydney Wanderers in the 2012–13 season.

2017–18
On 26 October 2017, Adelaide United signed Johns for the second time in her career. She made her second season debut coming on as a substitute as a right defender for Georgia Campagnale in a 2–1 loss against Newcastle Jets.

References

External links
 

1994 births
Living people
A-League Women players
Adelaide United FC (A-League Women) players
Women's association football central defenders
Australian women's soccer players